Hans Engert (22 April 1951 – 22 December 2020) was a German professional tennis player.

Born and raised in Mannheim, Engert was a long serving Bundesliga player for Grün-Weiss Mannheim and ranked as high as fifth nationally. In 1973 he qualified for the singles main draw of the Wimbledon Championships, where he lost his first round match in four sets to Chiradip Mukerjea. He later worked as the manager of Steffi Graf.

References

External links
 
 

1951 births
2020 deaths
West German male tennis players
Sportspeople from Mannheim
Tennis people from Baden-Württemberg